The River Alt is an urban river that flows across Merseyside in England. The river has suffered from heavy pollution from industry and sewage upstream and run-off from farmland in its lower reaches. It empties into the River Mersey, near to where the Mersey itself flows into the Irish Sea. The river has benefited from clean-up schemes and a de-culverting process to improve its water quality and provide a better environment for wildlife.

Etymology

The river's name might be of Latin origin (meaning muddy river) but the banks of the river are lined by villages and places with names of Old Norse derivation. The name Alt could also be derived from Brittonic alt, which can either mean 'cliff' or as is more likely in this case, 'burn, mountain stream' (Welsh allt, Irish ált). Thirdly, the obscure Celtic element *al-, suffixed with the Brittonic nominal suffix -ed may underlie this name.

Route
It then runs south of Formby and empties into the Irish Sea, near the edge of the River Mersey estuary at Hightown.

The Alts upper waters deriving from small streams and, in particular, one arising at Hag Plantation in Huyton. This is the location of the primary source of the river and is also the Huyton Wetlands Site of Biological Interest (SBI). The Alt then flows at a low gradient across an alluvium plain in a northwesterly direction before turning southwards and emptying into the River Mersey at Hightown between Crosby and Formby.

The Alt's catchment boundary reaches as far as Banks and Crossens in the north and out to Burscough and Kirkby in the east.

The river flows through varying types of land: Sherwood Sandstone in the Huyton area, Coal Measures in the West Derby area and eventually Mercia Mudstone in the Maghull/North Sefton area. The estuary forms part of the Ribble and Alt Estuaries Special Protection Area for wildlife.

Before the installation of tidal floodgates at Hightown in the 18th Century, the river was once called a "troublesome little river" its ever changing course cutting through the field boundaries, threatening roads and bridges and was rumoured to have wiped out the hamlet of Altmouth sometime between 1577 and 1713. However, studies of mapping have shown that there was never a village symbol at Altmouth on the maps, although one mapman stated there was a village there, but was unclear as to if it was on the north or south side of the river mouth. Flooding along the river was a problem until the 1960s when work to straighten and canalise the river, plus the opening of pumping stations at Crossens in 1959 and Altmouth in 1972, ended the regular inundation of fields by water from the sources and from the sea. The river downstream of Maghull is rich agricultural land, but  of it is below sea level and so requires the pumping stations to prevent tidal incursions into the river. The river was once well known for its fish and large quantities of eels were trapped upstream and in its tributaries. Flatfish like dabs, plaice and flounder were caught in the estuary and the tidal reaches, vast cockle beds were worked in the estuary.

The river began to change in the early 20th century as Liverpool expanded and industry, then new housing began to grow along its banks. By the 1970s, the pollution had affected the river so much, it was listed as being class 3 or 4, which meant that apart from bloodworms, there was no life in the river. Part of this problem lies with when the river was culverted and housing was erected near to and over the river, the wastewater pipes from the dwellings were wrongly connected to discharge their water directly into the river.

New sewage farms at Croxteth and Hillhouse plus modernisation to existing sewage farms and the decrease in heavy industry in Knowsley, Kirkby and Aintree began to clean up the river and by the early 1990s freshwater fish began to colonise the river from tributaries like Sudell Brook and Downholland Brook. By 2000, the river was well known among local anglers for its healthy population of pike, chub, bream, roach and sticklebacks.  Herons, kingfishers and, in summer, egrets can often be seen in the water. In 2016, the Environment Agency released 9,000 fish into the river to replenish stocks.

The Alt is still not clean due to its heritage as a handy dumping ground for sewage and industrial waste. Currently it has a moderate ecological rating but a fail rating for chemicals due to heavy metals in its silt.  However, in 2006, the amount of wildlife that lived in and around the river earned it a clean bill of health from the Environment Agency.

Improvements
The main channel was diverted and several smaller channels were created by the addition of berms to separate them. This has allowed plants to thrive and offers a floodplain where there was not one before.

In June 2014, a new section of the river was de-culverted and was lengthened through the addition of bends to improve the river's quality and also provide a greenspace for the nearby residents of Croxteth.

Settlements
 Hightown
 Formby
 Little Altcar
 Great Altcar
 Ince Blundell
 Maghull
 Aintree
 Melling
 Waddicar
 Kirkby
 Knowsley
 Croxteth
 West Derby
 Huyton

Tributaries
Downholland Brook
New Cut
Bull Cop
Sandy Brook
Old Canal
Fine Jane's Brook
Leather Barrow's Ditch
Cheshire Lines Brook
Barton Brook
Chisnall Brook
Rough Brook
Arnold's Cop
Main Sluice
Tongue's Watercourse
Within's Watercourse
Lydiate Brook
Carr Sluice
Maghull Hey Cop
Carr Sluice
Hunt's Brook
Maghull Brook
St. Helen's Gutter (as the Alt is known between Aintree and Maghull)
Dover's Brook
Whinny Brook
Harrison's Brook
Netherton's Brook
Kirkby Brook
Simonswood Brook
Knowsley Brook
Tue Brook

Gallery

References

Sources

External links

Alt Crossens pumping stations history videos
Firm fined for sewage pollution 
River Rehabilitation Scheme at Huyton
River rehabilitation in an urban environment: examples from the Mersey Basin, North West England
The River Alt flood management review

Alt